Curculionichthys insperatus is a species of catfish in the family Loricariidae. It is native to the Paraná River drainage in Brazil, where it inhabits streams near banks covered with partially submerged vegetation. It reaches 3 cm (1.2 inches) standard length. This species was formerly classified as a member of the genus Hisonotus, although it was moved to the then-new genus Curculionichthys in 2015.

References 

Loricariidae
Catfish of South America
Freshwater fish of Brazil
Endemic fauna of Brazil
Fish described in 2003